Essays: First Series, is a series of essays written by Ralph Waldo Emerson, published in 1841, concerning transcendentalism. This book contains:

"History"
"Self-Reliance"
"Compensation"
"Spiritual Laws"
"Love"
"Friendship"
"Prudence"
"Heroism"
"The Over-Soul"
"Circles"
"Intellect"
"Art"

Reception 
Many noted the influence of Thomas Carlyle. An anonymous English reviewer voiced the mainstream view when he wrote that the author of the book "out-Carlyles Carlyle himself," "imitat[ing] his inflations, his verbiage, his Germanico-Kantian abstractions, his metaphysics and mysticism." Jane Welsh Carlyle agreed, giving her impression in a letter to John Sterling: "I find him getting affected, stilted, mystical, and in short 'a considerable of a bore' A bad immitation [sic] of Carlyle's most Carlylish translations of Goethes [sic] most Goetheish passages!" For his part, Sterling described them to William Coningham as "the only book of any pith and significance that has dawned here lately . . . which at a glance, seem far ahead in compass and brilliancy of almost everything England has of late years (generations) produced".

See also

Essays: Second Series

References

External links 
 Essays: First Series at Google Books.
 

Essay collections by Ralph Waldo Emerson
1841 essays
1841 books